This is a list of Canadian Football League Yards Leaders by year.

2013-2021 scrimmage yards leaders
YEAR CFL LEADER TM YDS CFL LEADER TM YDS YEAR CFL LEADER TM TD RUNNER-UP TM TD
2021 STANBACK, Will Mtl 1,290 
2019 HARRIS, Andrew Wpg 1,902 
2018 HARRIS, Andrew Wpg 1,841 
2017 HARRIS, Andrew Wpg 1,892 
2016 BOWMAN, Adarius Edm 1,757 
2015 HARRIS, Andrew BC 1,523  
2014 BOWMAN, Adarius Edm 1,470 
2013 CORNISH, Jon Cgy 2,157

Canadian Football League records and statistics